Life on Planet Groove is a live album by Maceo Parker, released in 1992. It was recorded in concert at the club Stadtgarten in Cologne, Germany.

The album peaked at No. 3 on the Billboard Jazz Albums chart.

Critical reception
Entertainment Weekly wrote that the "live session’s gracefully fermented, pre-hip-hop mode of funk-making hits home." The Calgary Herald thought that "with Maceo, Life On Planet Groove is a carefree existence where spirits are imbued with physical jive, bodies do the 'mashed potato' and ears revel in generous amounts of harmonious horns, slathered with Motown vocals and topped with psychedelic bass."

Track listing
All tracks composed by Maceo Parker; except where indicated
"Shake Everything You've Got" 	(16:39)
"Pass the Peas"	(James Brown, John Starks, Charles Bobbit) 	(11:26)
"I Got You (I Feel Good)"	(James Brown)	(3:45)
"Got to Get U"	(7:08)
"Addictive Love"	(The Winans, Keith Thomas)	(8:58)
"Children's World"		(6:21)
"Georgia on My Mind"	(Hoagy Carmichael, Stuart Gorrell)	(7:23)
"Soul Power 92"	(James Brown, Maceo Parker, Bootsy Collins) (14:12)

Personnel
Maceo Parker - alto saxophone, vocals
Candy Dulfer - alto saxophone
Larry Goldings - Hammond organ
Vincent Henry - bass, alto saxophone
Rodney Jones - guitar
Pee Wee Ellis - flute, tenor saxophone, vocals
Kym Mazelle - vocals
Kenwood Dennard - drums
Fred Wesley - trombone, vocals

References

1992 live albums
Maceo Parker albums